Georg Fröhlich (born 17 March 1988) is a German motorcycle racer who has competed in the 125cc World Championship. He won the IDM 125 Championship in 2007.

Career statistics

Grand Prix motorcycle racing

By season

Races by year
(key)

References

External links
 Profile on MotoGP.com

1988 births
Living people
German motorcycle racers
125cc World Championship riders
People from Rochlitz
Sportspeople from Saxony